Aaron Douglas O'Connell (born March 5, 1981, in Allentown, Pennsylvania) is an American experimental quantum physicist.

While working under Andrew N. Cleland and John M. Martinis at the University of California, Santa Barbara, he created the world's first quantum machine.  In particular, he was able to transfer the quantum state of a superconducting quantum bit, a device used in quantum computation, to the motional state of a macroscopic mechanical resonator.   His measurements of the quantum machine constitute the first direct observations of quantized behavior in the motion of a visible object and led the journal Science to honor his work as the "Breakthrough of the Year" of 2010.

O'Connell spoke on the subject at TED2011 in Long Beach, California.

Academic career
O'Connell received his bachelor's degree from Eckerd College in St. Petersburg, Florida, in 2005, and his Ph.D. in physics from the University of California, Santa Barbara in 2010.

References

External links 
 
 
 Geoff Brumfiel's interview of Aaron D. O'Connell; Nature podcast

1981 births
Living people
21st-century American physicists
Eckerd College alumni
University of California, Santa Barbara alumni
Scientists from Allentown, Pennsylvania